Buffalo Springs is a village in Lubbock County, Texas, United States. The population was 453 at the 2010 census. It is part of the Lubbock Metropolitan Statistical Area.

Geography
The community is on the shores of Buffalo Springs Lake southeast of Lubbock.

Demographics

2020 census

As of the 2020 United States census, there were 468 people, 247 households, and 164 families residing in the village.

2000 census
As of the census of 2000, there were 493 people, 227 households, and 143 families residing in the village. The population density was 312.9 people per square mile (120.5/km2). There were 303 housing units at an average density of 192.3/sq mi (74.0/km2). The racial makeup of the village was 94.93% White, 0.61% African American, 0.61% Native American, 2.64% from other races, and 1.22% from two or more races. Hispanic or Latino of any race were 5.48% of the population.

There were 227 households, out of which 20.7% had children under the age of 18 living with them, 54.2% were married couples living together, 5.3% had a female householder with no husband present, and 37.0% were non-families. 30.0% of all households were made up of individuals, and 8.4% had someone living alone who was 65 years of age or older. The average household size was 2.17 and the average family size was 2.67.

In the village, the population was spread out, with 18.1% under the age of 18, 5.5% from 18 to 24, 26.6% from 25 to 44, 34.7% from 45 to 64, and 15.2% who were 65 years of age or older. The median age was 45 years. For every 100 females, there were 108.0 males. For every 100 females age 18 and over, there were 106.1 males.

The median income for a household in the village was $36,389, and the median income for a family was $40,500. Males had a median income of $27,404 versus $23,500 for females. The per capita income for the village was $19,488. About 3.1% of families and 6.9% of the population were below the poverty line, including 7.8% of those under age 18 and 3.7% of those age 65 or over.

Education
Buffalo Springs is served by the Roosevelt Independent School District.

See also
Yellow House Canyon
Ransom Canyon, Texas
Llano Estacado
North Fork Double Mountain Fork Brazos River
West Texas

References

Villages in Lubbock County, Texas
Villages in Texas
Lubbock metropolitan area